Aspergillus petersonii is a species of fungus in the genus Aspergillus which has been isolated from an office  environment.

References

Further reading 
 

petersonii
Fungi described in 2015